The discography of Peter Buffett, an American musician, composer, author and philanthropist, consists of seventeen studio albums, two EPs, over thirty singles, and fourteen releases from compilations with other artists.

Studio albums

EPs

Singles

With Comet9

Compilations

Production

References

General
 
 

Buffet, Peter